Milan Terrell Acquaah (born December 22, 1997) is an American-Ghanaian professional basketball player for Enosis Neon Parlimni of the Cyprus Basketball Division A. He played college basketball for the Washington State Cougars and the California Baptist Lancers.

Early life and high school career
Acquaah was raised in Bakersfield, California and attended Warren Middle School. He began his high school career at Chino Hills High School and befriended Lonzo Ball after meeting him at a gym in Los Angeles. Acquaah is mentioned on Ball's hip hop album Born 2 Ball. Acquaah transferred to La Salle College Prep. He transferred again to Cathedral High School and played alongside Kobe Paras. Acquaah made a game-winning three-pointer to win the San Fernando Valley Invitational championship in December 2014. Acquaah was regarded as a three-star prospect, the No. 39 point guard in his class, and signed with Washington State in November 2015.

College career
Acquaah began his collegiate career at Washington State where he redshirted his freshman season. During his redshirt year, coach Ernie Kent called him "unguardable" during scrimmages. As a redshirt freshman, Acquaah averaged 4.9 points and 1.9 assists per game, making nine starts. He scored a season-high 13 points during a loss to UCLA. After the season, Acquaah announced he was transferring.

Acquaah opted to move to California Baptist, which was transferring to Division I, and was granted a waiver for immediate eligibility. He scored 36 points in a win against New Mexico State on January 3, 2019. As a redshirt sophomore, Acquaah averaged 19.0 points and 5.0 rebounds per game. He was named WAC player of the week honors twice and was named WAC Newcomer of the Year and First Team All-Conference. After the season, he declared for the 2019 NBA draft but decided to return to California Baptist. As a junior, Acquaah averaged 18.1 points, 5.8 assists, and 4.9 rebounds per game. He was named WAC Player of the Year. Following the season, he declared for the 2020 NBA draft.

Professional career
On July 25, 2021, Acquaah signed his first professional contract with Enosis Neon Paralimni of the Cyprus Basketball Division A.

Career statistics

College

|-
| style="text-align:left;"| 2016–17
| style="text-align:left;"| Washington State
| style="text-align:center;" colspan="11"|  Redshirt
|-
| style="text-align:left;"| 2017–18
| style="text-align:left;"| Washington State
| 30 || 9 || 17.5 || .388 || .263 || .540 || 1.8 || 1.9 || .6 || .0 || 4.9
|-
| style="text-align:left;"| 2018–19
| style="text-align:left;"| California Baptist
| 31 || 30 || 32.1 || .415 || .374 || .850 || 5.0 || 3.4 || 1.6 || .1 || 19.0
|-
| style="text-align:left;"| 2019–20
| style="text-align:left;"| California Baptist
| 31 || 31 || 32.6 || .376 || .318 || .836 || 4.9 || 5.8 || .9 || .2 || 18.1
|- class="sortbottom"
| style="text-align:center;" colspan="2"| Career
| 92 || 70 || 27.5 || .394 || .336 || .802 || 3.9 || 3.7 || 1.0 || .1 || 14.1

References

External links
California Baptist Lancers bio
Washington State Cougars bio

1997 births
Living people
American men's basketball players
American sportspeople of Ghanaian descent
California Baptist Lancers men's basketball players
Point guards
Basketball players from Bakersfield, California
Washington State Cougars men's basketball players